is a Japanese voice actress affiliated with I'm Enterprise. She is the narrator of Animax.

Biography
Yahagi lived in Hachinohe, Aomori. She thought "Anime is a picture talking" and said that she had no idea about voice acting until her friend talked about it. She attended junior high school in the wake of a friend telling her that she "sounds like anime". Without a theater club, she joined the softball club in accordance with her father's recommendation. On January 31, 2015, the official site of her office announced that Yahagi was married to a man outside of the industry.

Filmography

Anime series
2005
Karin – Karin Maaka

2006
Fairy Musketeers – Gretel, Kyupi
Kanon – Shiori's Classmate
School Rumble: 2nd Semester – Mio Tennōji
Tokimeki Memorial Only Love – Yuuka Fujikawa
Buso Renkin – Hanaka Busujima
Wan Wan Celeb Soreyuke! Tetsunoshin – Audrey

2007
Venus Versus Virus – Tsukuyo
Over Drive – Kaho Asahi 
Kaze no Stigma – Yui
Kishin Taisen Gigantic Formula – Utsumi "Ucchie" Amano
Shattered Angels – Kuu Shiratori
Kenko Zenrakei Suieibu Umisho – Maaya Nanako 
Sola – Chisato Mizuguchi, Grade School Friend
Gurren Lagann – Girl
Bakugan Battle Brawlers – Ai
Hayate the Combat Butler – Izumi Segawa
Potemayo – Eiko Hanabusa

2008
Ga-Rei-Zero – Mami Izumi
Kyōran Kazoku Nikki – Kyupi Do
Hell Girl: Three Vessels – Ririka Katase
Shugo Chara! – Rima Mashiro
Shugo Chara!! Doki— – Rima Mashiro
Sekirei – Mitsuha
Tytania – Lira Florenz
To Love Ru – Haruna Sairenji
Net Ghost PiPoPa – Hikaru Sofue
Nodame Cantabile: Paris – Puririn
Noramimi – Yocchan
Pocket Monsters: Diamond & Pearl – Aki
Rosario + Vampire – Waitress
Rosario + Vampire Capu2 – Tonko Oniyama

2009
Sweet Blue Flowers – Yoko Hon'atsugi
Samurai Harem – Sakon Saginomiya
Asura Cryin' – Ania Fortuna
Asura Cryin' 2 – Ania Fortuna
Queen's Blade: The Exiled Virgin – Ahtel
Guin Saga – Suni
Clannad After Story – Student
Black Butler – Lan-Mao
Gokujō!! Mecha Mote Iinchō – Anju Sano
Shugo Chara! Party! – Rima Mashiro
Heaven's Lost Property – Eve
The Girl Who Leapt Through Space – Erika, Satchan
Cheburashka Arere? – Garlya
A Certain Scientific Railgun – Akemi
Nogizaka Haruka no Himitsu: Purezza – Juri Rokujō
First Love Limited – Nanoka Kyuuma
Hayate the Combat Butler!! – Izumi Segawa
Battle Spirits: Shōnen Gekiha Dan – Female Attendant 3
Fight Ippatsu! Jūden-chan!! – Iono Tomonaga
Yatterman – Carmen
Yumeiro Pâtissière – Miya Koshiro, Marron

2010
Demon King Daimao – Yukiko
The Betrayal Knows My Name – Aya Kureha, Miki
MM! – Noa Hiiragi
Ōkami-san & Her Seven Companions – Suzume Shitagiri
Otome Yōkai Zakuro – Kumiko Agemaki
Black Butler II – Lan-Mao
Occult Academy – Bunmei-kun
Ōkiku Furikabutte ~Natsu no Taikai-hen~ – Asuka Hanai
Seitokai Yakuindomo – Suzu Hagimura
Tantei Opera Milky Holmes – Irene Doala
Chu-Bra!! – Haruka Shiraishi
Bakuman – Kaya Miyoshi
Motto To Love Ru – Haruna Sairenji
Yumeiro Pâtissière SP Professional – Miya Koshiro, Marron

2011
Croisée in a Foreign Labyrinth - The Animation – Camille
Kimi to Boku – Hisako Aida
Sket Dance – Baby, Kawakami, Momo's Voice
Sacred Seven – Aoi Aiba
The Qwaser of Stigmata II – Nami Okiura
Softenni – Elizabeth Warren
The Mystic Archives of Dantalian – Raziel
Bakuman. 2 – Kaya Miyoshi
Haganai – Yukiko Nagata
Maken-Ki! – Kodama Himegami
Dream Eater Merry – Mistilteinn
Working'!! – Momoka Suzutani

2012
The Ambition of Oda Nobuna – Akechi Mitsuhide
Cardfight!! Vanguard: Asia Circuit Hen – Christopher Lo
Kimi to Boku 2 – Hisako Aida
Sankarea: Undying Love – Ranko Saōji
Polar Bear's Café – Penko
Sword Art Online – Sakuya
My Little Monster – Yū Miyama
To Love Ru Darkness – Haruna Sairenji
Bakuman. 3 – Kaya Miyoshi
Hayate the Combat Butler: Can't Take My Eyes Off You – Izumi Segawa

2013
Cardfight!! Vanguard: Link Joker Hen – Akari Yotsue, Christopher Lo
Karneval – Tsubame
A Town Where You Live – Mina Nagoshi
Beyond the Boundary – Yui Inami
Sword Art Online: Extra Edition – Sakuya
Tamayura - More Aggressive – Harumi Kawai
Hayate the Combat Butler! Cuties – Izumi Segawa

2014
M3 the dark metal – Raika Kasumi
Black Butler: Book of Circus – Ran-Mao
Brynhildr in the Darkness – Saori
Silver Spoon – Ayame Minamikujō
Seitokai Yakuindomo* – Suzu Hagimura
Tokyo ESP – Mami Izumi
Maken-Ki! Battling Venus 2 – Kodama Himegami

2015
Assassination Classroom – Manami Okuda
Utawarerumono: The False Faces – Honoka
Go! Princess Precure – Ranko Ichijō
Saekano: How to Raise a Boring Girlfriend – Michiru Hyōdō
To Love Ru Darkness 2nd – Haruna Sairenji
Plastic Memories – Zack
Rampo Kitan: Game of Laplace – Girl Student, Hoshino, Onlookers E

2016
Assassination Classroom 2nd Season – Manami Okuda
She and Her Cat - Friend
Kamisama Minarai: Himitsu no Cocotama – Vivit
D.Gray-man Hallow – Timothy Hearst
The Seven Deadly Sins: Signs of Holy War – Pelliot
Kiss Him, Not Me – Kirari Nanashima
Keijo – Kei Higuchi

2017
 Saekano: How to Raise a Boring Girlfriend Flat – Michiru Hyōdō
 Urara Meirocho – Mari

2018
 Dame×Prince Anime Caravan – Ani Inako
 Steins;Gate 0 – Maho Hiyajo

2019
 Aikatsu Friends! – Hiro
 Senryu Girl – Amane Katagiri

2020
 Hatena Illusion – Nana's Mother
 Super HxEros – Momoka Momozono
 The Misfit of Demon King Academy – Owl

2021
 Fairy Ranmaru – Shina
 Life Lessons with Uramichi Oniisan – Puppy Sayuri
 The Quintessential Quintuplets ∬ – Shimoda
 To Your Eternity – Chan

2022
 Shin Ikki Tousen – Ganryū Sasaki

Anime films
 Sword Art Online The Movie: Ordinal Scale (2017) – Sakuya
 Seitokai Yakuindomo: The Movie (2017) – Suzu Hagimura
 Saekano the Movie: Finale (2019) – Michiru Hyodo
 Seitokai Yakuindomo: The Movie 2 (2021) – Suzu Hagimura
 “ The Quintessential Quintuplets Movie “ (2022)- Shimoda

Original video animation
Hayate the Combat Butler – Izumi Segawa
Indian Summer –  Ran Midō
Kemono to Chat – Mito Azuma
Otogi-Jūshi Akazukin – Gretel
Seitokai Yakuindomo – Suzu Hagimura
Seitokai Yakuindomo* — Suzu Hagimura
Strike Witches: Operation Victory Arrow, Vol. 3 - Arnhem Bridge - Amelie Planchard
To Love Ru – Haruna Sairenji
To Love Ru Darkness — Haruna Sairenji
Yotsunoha – Arisa Yuki
Touhou Musou Kakyou: A Summer Day's Dream – Reisen Udongein Inaba

Video games
Granblue Fantasy - Ejaeli
Disgaea 3: Absence of Detention – Rutile
Suikoden Tierkreis – Manaril
Tokimeki Memorial 4 – Tsugumi Godo
Senran Kagura Shinovi Versus – Murasaki
Senran Kagura: Estival Versus – Murasaki
Tears to Tiara II: Heir of the Overlord – Kleito
Steins;Gate 0 – Maho Hiyajo
Stella Glow – Nonoka
Dragon Ball Xenoverse – Time Patroller (Female 2)
Grand Chase: Dimensional Chaser - Doctor Molly
God Eater Resonant Ops – Vilma Kühnenfels
Azur Lane – Kinu
Arknights – Cutter
Girls' Frontline - Vigneron M2, A-545

Drama CD
 The Idolmaster Neue Green for Dearly Stars – Yumeko Sakurai
 Given – Uenoyama Yayoi

Dubbing

Lego DC Comics Super Heroes: Justice League: Gotham City Breakout – Harley Quinn
Hanazuki: Full of Treasures - Kiazuki 
PAW Patrol - Zuma
PAW Patrol: The Movie - Zuma

References

External links
Official agency profile 

1986 births
Living people
Animax
I'm Enterprise voice actors
Japanese video game actresses
Japanese voice actresses
Voice actresses from Tokyo